The San Francisco Veterans Memorial is a memorial commemorating veterans in San Francisco's Civic Center, in the U.S. state of California. The stone octagon memorial, located across from San Francisco City Hall between Herbst Theatre and War Memorial Opera House, was dedicated in 2014. Inscribed in the stone is Archibald MacLeish's poem, "The Young Dead Soldiers Do Not Speak".

References

External links

 

2014 establishments in California
Civic Center, San Francisco
Monuments and memorials in California